Mohamed Youssef (born 30 December 1964) is an international sailor who competes for Djibouti.

Youssef competed in the 1996 Summer Olympics held in Atlanta, he entered the Laser class and after 11 races he finished 55th out of the 56 that finished.

References

1964 births
Living people
Olympic sailors of Djibouti
Djiboutian male sailors (sport)
Sailors at the 1996 Summer Olympics – Laser